Aquatics at the 1983 Southeast Asian Games included swimming, diving and water polo events. The three sports of aquatics were held at Toa Payoh Swimming Complex, Singapore City, Singapore. Aquatics events was held between 29 May to 3 June.

Medal winners

Swimming
Men's events

Women's events

Water polo

Diving

Medal table

References
 https://eresources.nlb.gov.sg/newspapers/Digitised/Article/straitstimes19830530-1.2.106
 https://eresources.nlb.gov.sg/newspapers/Digitised/Article/straitstimes19830531-1.2.123
 https://eresources.nlb.gov.sg/newspapers/Digitised/Article/straitstimes19830601-1.2.137
 https://eresources.nlb.gov.sg/newspapers/Digitised/Article/straitstimes19830602-1.2.102

1983
1983 Southeast Asian Games events
1983 in water sports